Doris Younane  (born 25 February 1963) is an Australian stage and screen actress notable for her role in McLeod's Daughters where she played Moira Doyle. She is of Lebanese descent.

Career
Her roles include Titania in A Midsummer Night's Dream and Yola Fatoush in Heartbreak High. Younane acted in McLeod's Daughters. In  the early seasons, she was a recurring cast member and in later seasons she became a regular cast member. Younane also performed some of the songs heard during the series.
Doris is currently appearing in Five Bedrooms, a comedy drama set in a shared house. The third series is currently being aired in Australia, whilst the first two seasons have been shown in the UK on BBC One, as part of their daytime schedule.

Filmography

References

External links
 

1963 births
Australian television actresses
Australian film actresses
Australian stage actresses
Australian people of Lebanese descent
Living people